The J. F. Kennedy Memorial in Birmingham, England, is a memorial mosaic mural to John F. Kennedy, by Kenneth Budd.

The mosaic, commissioned by Birmingham's Irish community, and funded by public subscription, was constructed in panels, at Budd's company in south London, Kenneth Budd and Associates.

Original location 

The mosaic was erected on St Chad's Circus (at approx ), outside the City's Roman Catholic St Chad's Cathedral, in July 1968, at a cost of £5,000. When the road system was redeveloped in 2007 the mosaic was demolished. Key features, including the heads of some of the main figures, were retrieved and retained by Kenneth Budd's son Oliver.

Re-creation 

In 2012 it was re-created using new materials.  The new mosaic was erected in January 2013, in the city's Irish Quarter, on Floodgate Street in Digbeth, in reworked form, including the controversial addition of a new face, that of former Lord Mayor of Birmingham Mike Nangle, the city's first Irish Lord Mayor. The work was overseen by Budd's son, Oliver, who worked from his father's original drawings. The retained sections were not used as the colours had faded and would not match the new Smalti mosaic tiles. A formal unveiling took place on 23 February 2013.

Composition 

Featured alongside Kennedy in the mosaic are his brother Teddy, the Seal of the President of the United States (using real gold), Martin Luther King Jr., American policemen and other figures.

Text 
The text gives an incorrect date of 1960, the year he was elected, for the start of his presidency, when he was actually president from January 1961. This inaccuracy was also present in the original creation.

The original mosaic had wording at either side. The wording on the right said (all in upper case):

There are
no white or
coloured
signs on 
the grave-
yards of
battle

The recreated mosaic has different words. On the left (again, all in upper case):

In tribute 
to John F 
Kennedy 
President 
of 
the United 
States 
1960-3

and to the right:

A man 
may die 
nations 
may rise 
and fall 
but an 
idea 
lives on

See also
 List of memorials to John F. Kennedy
 Cultural depictions of John F. Kennedy
 List of buildings and monuments honoring presidents of the United States in other countries

References

External links 

 1968 Pathe newsreel of the mosaic under construction

Public art in England
Birmingham
Culture in Birmingham, West Midlands
Murals in the United Kingdom
Mosaics
1960s murals
Buildings and structures completed in 1968
1968 in England
History of Birmingham, West Midlands
Buildings and monuments honouring American presidents in the United Kingdom
Monuments and memorials in England
Flags in art